Lady Jean Alice Elaine Cochrane (later Hervey, then Macdonald; 1887–1955) was a Welsh and Scottish aristocrat. She was the daughter of Winifred, Countess of Dundonald and Douglas Cochrane, 12th Earl of Dundonald.

Work and duties 
Cochrane was a famous figure in her time. In her youth, she modelled for prominent publications and appeared in The Bystander, Tatler, Country Life, and The Sketch.

During the First World War, In 1916, she became a nurse who treated war casualties at the Red cross hospital at Portman Square, London.

In 1917, she was within Diplomatic services and was serving within the Foreign office at Whitehall, London.

She helped support the Society for Waifs and Strays by opening several fundraisers for the cause. a society which directly improves the lives of children and young people for whom it provides services and to create a positive shift in social attitudes to improve the situation facing all children and young people.

On 14 July 1937 she launched the Royal Navy warship HMS Enchantress.

Personal life 
Lady Jean was the fourth child to Winifred and Douglas Cochrane, who spent most of her youth at Gwrych Castle.

She was a keen sportswoman who was particularly fond of golf.

On 19 October 1914 she married Lord Herbert Hervey with whom, produced a son; Victor Hervey, 6th Marquess of Bristol, his godmother was the Spanish Queen Victoria Eugenie of Battenberg.

In 1932, after lady Jean discovered that her husband was having an affair at their Portman Square apartment, she filed for divorce on grounds of adultery and in July of that same year, the divorce was granted without Herbert contesting. The Portsmouth Evening News's divorce section, stated "Lady Jean complained of her husband's association with other women shortly after they were married, and differences arose".

In December 1933, Cochrane remarried at a London register office to a Captain Peter Macdonald. Macdonald, later knighted, was a Conservative politician for the Isle of Wight which Jean helped him in his work.

She died in 1955 at the age of 67.

References

1887 births
1955 deaths
20th-century Welsh women
20th-century Welsh people
British socialites
British women in World War I
Jean
Daughters of British earls
Female nurses in World War I
Spouses of British politicians
Wives of knights